Mala Goba is a small settlement north of Gabrovka in the Municipality of Litija in central Slovenia. The area is part of the traditional region of Lower Carniola. It is now included with the rest of the municipality in the Central Sava Statistical Region.

Name
Mala Goba was attested in written sources as Schwainperg in 1406, Panperg in 1444, and Klein Schbamberg in 1499.

References

External links

Mala Goba on Geopedia

Populated places in the Municipality of Litija